Vidya is 1948 Bollywood family drama film directed by Girish Trivedi, starring Dev Anand, Suraiya and Madan Puri.

Cast
 Dev Anand as Chandrashekhar "Chandu"
 Suraiya as Vidya
 Madan Puri as Harilal "Harry"
 Ghulam Mohammad as Vidya's Father  
 Maya Banerjee as Leela
 Cuckoo as Dancer

Production

During the shooting of the song "Kinare Kinare Chale Jayen Ge" in the film, a boat capsized and Dev Anand saved co-star Suraiya from drowning. After this incident Suraiya fell in love with him and they began a long relationship. The film marked the start of over half a dozen appearances in films together.

Music
All music was composed by Sachin Dev Burman
 "Jhoom Rahi Jhoom Rahi Khushiyo Ki Naav Aaj" - Suraiya
 "Meri Muniya Ki Ankhiya Me Tu Aaja Nindiya" - Amirbai Karnataki
 "Laai Kushi Ki Duniyaa Hansati Hui Jawaani" - Mukesh, Suraiya
 "O Krishn Kanhaai Aashaaon Ki Duniyaa Men" - Suraiya
 "Kise Maalum Thaa Do Din Men Saavan Bit Jaayegaa" - Suraiya
 "Jivan Jyoti Bhujti Jaye" - Amirbai Karnataki
 "Bahe Na Kabhi Nain Se Nir" - Mukesh
 "Kinaare Kinaare Chale Jaayenge" - Suraiya
 "Bhagawan Tere Sansaar Ke Hain Khel Niraale" - Amirbai Karnataki
 "Pyar Ban Ke Mujh Pe Koi Cha Gaya" - Lalita Deulkar
 "Bahen Na Kabhi Nain Se Neer Uthi Ho Chahe" - Mukesh

References

External links 

 
 

1948 films
1940s Hindi-language films
Films scored by S. D. Burman
Indian black-and-white films
Indian romantic drama films
1948 romantic drama films